Clara Phillips (born Clara Anne Weaver, June 23, 1898 – 1969), nicknamed the "Tiger Woman", was an American showgirl and chorus girl who, in 1922, murdered 19-year-old bank teller Alberta Meadows based on rumors that her husband, Armour L. Phillips, was having an affair with her. Phillips's crime has been described as "brutal" and "remorseless" by many local and national news organizations as they reported on her crime and subsequent escape and recapture.

Early life and career 

Clara Anne Weaver was born on June 23, 1898 in Waco, Texas as one of five children to John Weaver and Anna Jackson. Throughout her childhood, her family moved frequently around Texas and settled in Houston when she was a teenager. Once there, she met Armour Phillips, who was a part of the poorer side of the Mellon family which had moved to Texas. She and Armour married in Houston on November 13, 1913. Armour wanted to become an oilman, while Weaver wanted to become an actress.  They moved to Vermont Square, Los Angeles.

Phillips was relatively successful in her acting career, working as a chorus girl at the Pantages Theatre in Hollywood and was hired by Mack Sennett for one of his Sennett Bathing Beauties works. Although both had luxury, her schedule conflicted with Armour's lifestyle, so she soon quit her job to spend her time with him, though Armour started to spend his time elsewhere. Because of this, their neighbors started rumors that he was seeing a younger girl named Alberta Gibson Tremaine Meadows, a 19-year-old bank teller and a widow.

Crime

Murder 
Phillips investigated the rumors by quietly stalking both of them, trying to see if her suspicions were correct or not. She followed Armour to First National Bank, at which Meadows worked, and it was all that she needed to convince herself that an affair was happening.

On July 10, Phillips went to a five-and-dime store where she picked up a 15-cent hammer and asked a store employee if it could kill a woman, to which the clerk replied that it could, assuming she was joking. The next day, Phillips, accompanied by friend and fellow showgirl Peggy Caffee, broke into Meadows's home to find that she wasn't there. They then went to her workplace where Phillips, claiming to be drunk, asked Meadows to drive them to Montecito Heights. Once there, Phillips asked Meadows to step outside to discuss something, and she interrogated Meadows on the affair, which Meadows denied. Phillips then began beating her with the hammer and then rolled a 50-pound boulder onto her dead body before driving home. Caffee was apparently terrified of the murder and kept quiet.

Search and arrest 
When she arrived, still drenched in Alberta’s blood, she told Armour that she was going to cook him the "best dinner he’d ever had because she was so happy," as she told Armour about the crime. Armour was repulsed, but still helped Clara get rid of evidence and slip away from Los Angeles. The morning after, Armour sent Phillips on a train and then went to the cops to tell them about the murder as advised by a lawyer. The police found Meadows's body and described it as similar to a tiger attack, dubbing her the "Tiger Woman," which stuck. On July 14, police in Tucson, Arizona said that they had her in custody.

Trial 

Phillips stayed silent on the murder as the trial neared. On September 17, 1922, Phillips stood for trial. Armour hired attorney Bert Herrington and the prosecution was Charles Fricke, with the jury consisting of nine men and three women. Caffee testified during the hearing about how Phillips murdered Meadows, while Phillips claimed that Caffee killed Meadows after she and Meadows got into a fistfight, which saved her. Most didn't believe Phillips's story except for journalist Jesse Carson. On November 16, 1922, Phillips was convicted of second-degree murder and was sentenced to 10 years to life, saved from the death penalty by her looks according to some members of the jury.

Escape and recapture 

On December 5, 1922, a jail matron made a routine check on Phillips's cell and saw the cell empty, with bars sawed clean and an open window. The police questioned Armour, who said that he did not know of nor aid  her escape, as well as her two sisters, Ola Weaver and Etta Mae Jackson, who said that their father left the night before to go to a downtown hotel. The police theorized that Phillips fled to Mexico, and sent information to Mexican authorities. In April 1923, police in San Salvador, El Salvador spotted Phillips, and on April 23, police in Tegucigalpa, Honduras arrested her, as well as her accomplice Jesse Carson and Phillips's sister Etta.  Phillips had been living under the name "Mrs. R. H. Young". During her time in jail in Honduras, she convinced a crowd of teenage boys to help her escape, but a jail warden overheard them and promptly arrested the 15 boys. In jail, Carson denied knowing Phillips and proclaimed innocence.

On May 2, 1923, early in the morning, Phillips was transferred from Tegucigalpa to Omoa Castle.  On May 26, she was brought back to Los Angeles by Sheriff Eugene W. Biscailuz. It was discovered that she had used Carson to obtain a saw, which she used to cut the bars, and was then lifted by Carson and two other men onto the roof. She and Carson made plans for travel as Mr. and Mrs. Jesse Carlson and spent five weeks in Los Angeles, then going to Texas and Louisiana before sailing to Veracruz, Mexico and travelling to Mexico City where they met with Etta Jackson.

Life in jail 
On June 2, 1923, guards brought Clara back into San Quentin State Prison. Phillips attempted to commit suicide by slitting her wrists, but then resolved to be a model prisoner for an early release. In 1926, she was allowed to temporarily leave to see her dying mother. In 1929, Phillips asked Governor C. C. Young to release her so she could become a good wife, but Young denied her request.

While in prison, Phillips studied to become a dental assistant and met a convicted burglar named Thomas Price. In September 1932, a correctional officer intercepted a love letter from Phillips to Price, which stripped her of her visitation, library, and mail rights in prison as well as parole, as the board denied her in 1933 and 1934 due to the letters. Although Armour still stood by his wife for a while, the two stopped communicating and eventually divorced.

Release and aftermath 
On June 17, 1935, Phillips was released from prison with plans to become a "useful citizen and a model housewife." She told reporters that she was going to San Diego to work as a dental assistant. Not much is known about Phillips afterwards, other than her changing her name and reportedly being spotted in Texas in 1961.

In popular culture 
L.A. Not So Confidential, hosted by Dr. Shiloh Catanese & Dr. Scott Musgrove, talked about Phillips and the murder in 2021.
Tenfold More Wicked, a podcast hosted by Kate Winkler Dawson, talked about Phillips in the season 4 premiere in 2022.

References 

20th-century American criminals
American female criminals
American showgirls
1898 births
1969 deaths
American murderers
American female murderers